Yelena Sergeevna Shchapova de Carli (nee Kozlova (Козлова), also known by her Italianised name Contessa Elena Sciapova de Carli, born June 22, 1950, Moscow, USSR) is an Italian-Russian model, writer and poet.

Biography
Elena Sergeevna Kozlova was born in Moscow in 1950. Besides working as a model, she wrote poetry. 

Her first husband was Viktor Schapov, an artist. She was married to Eduard Limonov in 1971. She and her husband emigrated from the Soviet Union to the United States in 1974. Shortly after, she divorced Limonov and married an Italian nobleman, Count Gianfranco de Carlo, also gaining Italian citizenship.

Shchapova published her first book, "It's me Yelena", in 1984, as a response to It's Me, Eddie.

Literature
Yelena Shchapova is one of the main characters in Limonov's book It's Me, Eddie. She is also a character in Carrère's novel Limonov.

External links
 Interview with Yelena Shchapova on Pravda.ru
 Reportage about Yelena Shchapova in NTV
 Interview with Yelena Shchapova

Living people
1950 births
Russian female models
Russian women novelists
Soviet emigrants to the United States
Russian women poets
Italian people of Russian descent